The Aiguille des Grands Montets (3,295 m) is a mountain in the Mont Blanc massif in Haute-Savoie, France.

Mountains of the Alps
Alpine three-thousanders
Mountains of Haute-Savoie